Salute Me or Shoot Me 4 (Banned from America) is a mixtape by American hip hop recording artist Waka Flocka Flame. It was released on September 13, 2012. The mixtape features guest appearances from Gucci Mane, Wale, Roscoe Dash, Frenchie, Yo Gotti, Dorrough, Shawty Lo, Trae Tha Truth, Wooh Da Kid, and Chief Keef among others.

Critical response 

Adam Fleischer of XXL gave the mixtape an L, saying "The beats here are all calculatedly trap music-tested, as is Salute Me or Shoot Me 4‘s content. But that’s precisely what Waka was aiming for, and what he needed. Though the style of his energy and aggression on record is no longer as surprising as it initially was, it’s still just as magnetic. When given two choices with this tape’s title, a salute for Waka is probably both safer and more fitting." Jordan Sargent of Pitchfork gave the mixtape a 6.7 out of 10, saying "Waka's energy has an almost gravitational pull and it's as strong here as ever. But lately, he's begun to expose a softer side of himself (like subtitling his last album Friends, Fans, and Family) that makes him Fozzie Bear-lovable. In fact, his songs are hardly even angry anymore. There's a gleeful streak running through Salute Me 4 that gives it a decidedly different vibe: It's an hour of shouting that sounds like a hug."

Track listing

References

2012 mixtape albums
Waka Flocka Flame albums
Sequel albums
Albums produced by London on da Track
Albums produced by Southside (record producer)